Fred Anton Maier (15 December 1938 – 9 June 2015) was a speed skater from Norway. He was among the dominating skaters throughout the 1960s, specialising in the longer distances. 

Maier won four Olympic medals: silver on the 10,000 m and bronze on the 5,000 m at the 1964 Olympics, and gold on the 5,000 m and silver on the 10,000 m at the 1968 Olympics. In 1968, he also became European and World Allround Champion. In total, Maier set eleven world records. For a brief week in 1968 he held four world records simultaneously, the 3,000 m, 5,000 m, 10,000 m, and the allround samalogue record.

In addition, Maier excelled in cycling, winning two National Time Trial Championships bronze medals (in 1957 and 1967). In 1967, he was awarded the Egebergs Ærespris and in 1968, he won the Oscar Mathisen Award and was chosen Norwegian Sportsperson of the Year.

Maier died from cancer on 9 June 2015 at the age of 76.

Medals 

An overview of medals won by Maier at important championships he participated in, listing the years in which he won each:

Records

World records 
Over the course of his career, Maier skated eleven world records:

Source: SpeedSkatingStats.com

Personal records 
To put these personal records in perspective, the WR column lists the official world records on the dates that Maier skated his personal records.

Maier has an Adelskalender score of 173.518 points. His highest ranking on the Adelskalender was a second place.

Biography 
 Maier forteller til Knut Bjørnsen (Aschehoug, Oslo, 1968)

References

External links
 Personal records from Jakub Majerski's Speedskating Database
 Evert Stenlund's Adelskalender pages

1938 births
2015 deaths
World record setters in speed skating
Norwegian male speed skaters
Norwegian male cyclists
Olympic speed skaters of Norway
Olympic gold medalists for Norway
Olympic silver medalists for Norway
Olympic bronze medalists for Norway
Speed skaters at the 1964 Winter Olympics
Speed skaters at the 1968 Winter Olympics
Olympic medalists in speed skating
People from Vestfold
Medalists at the 1964 Winter Olympics
Medalists at the 1968 Winter Olympics
World Allround Speed Skating Championships medalists
Deaths from cancer in Norway
Sportspeople from Vestfold og Telemark